Clarkson is an outer northern suburb of Perth, Western Australia, located 34 kilometres north of Perth's central business district in the City of Wanneroo.

While mostly a residential area, it also functions as a town centre, serving many surrounding areas with a vast amount of amenities and facilities. The suburb has a railway station on the Joondalup railway line and also is a major public transport hub for surrounding suburbs.

Geography
Clarkson is bounded to the west by Mindarie (Marmion Avenue) and to the north by Merriwa and Ridgewood (Hester Avenue). The Joondalup railway line divides Clarkson from the Neerabup National Park in the east. South of Clarkson is Tamala Park, which is uninhabited.

History

Name
The suburb's name refers to the Clarksons, a family of sheep farmers who had held leases of land in the area since the 19th century. Clarkson was originally gazetted as "Mindarie" by the Shire of Wanneroo in 1979, but the two names were transposed in 1985 at the request of Smith Corporation, who went on to develop the Mindarie Keys Marina three years later.

Early use
The first permanent settler with European ancestry in the area was the Barnard Drummond Clarkson, a sheep-farmer who also held land in Toodyay. Clarkson first acquired a pastoral lease in 1888 of 13,000 acres in the areas comprising modern-day Mindarie, Clarkson, Quinns Rocks and Merriwa. The leases were known as the Mindarie Pastoral Company, and the lands were primarily used for sheep-herding by subsequent generations of the Clarkson family.

The ruins of the Clarksons' first homestead and home of the Mindarie Pastoral Company are today preserved in Riverlinks Park on Connolly Drive.

Suburban development
The Mindarie Pastoral Company leases were sold by John Clarkson in 1952. The land subsequently saw no development or settlement until the early 1990s, naturally following the completion of the adjacent Mindarie Marina and subsequent residential dwellings in the area. The north-eastern portion of Clarkson around the high school was developed later in 1995. The suburb continued to be built throughout the 2000s, with a steadily growing population.

Outside of Clarkson's main commercial zone in the south-west, the suburb consists mostly of residential, detached bungalow housing with vast amounts of parkland. There is a strip of two-storey apartment blocks along Ocean Keys Boulevard, immediately opposite the railway station, and another strip of apartments closer to the shopping centre on Ningaloo Bend. The suburb also contains a lot of Keystart homes.

Somerly
Somerly is a commercial and housing development in south-east Clarkson, principally surrounding the railway station, that was completed in 2008. The 1,800-lot community was built on a  area in a partnership between development company Urban Pacific and the Western Australia Government Department of Housing and Works land development agency Landstart. The project aimed to provide a community-within-a-community with commercial enterprise, fibre-optic to the home internet, and a landscaping package (totaling at A$8,000) at no extra cost to new home-buyers.

The development of the Somerly area made Clarkson one of the largest, most densely populated suburbs in Perth's northern corridor, with a population now approaching 12,000. It is roughly delineated from the older, established parts of Clarkson by Liberty Drive to the north, Connolly Drive to the west and Polglase Fairway to the south-west.

Catalina

A new residential estate under the preliminary name of "Catalina" is being planned for development in 2012. The estate's proposed boundaries lay south of Neerabup Road (which is presently bushland blending into Tamala Park) and extend from the Joondalup rail line in the east, to the coast of Mindarie Beach and Claytons Beach to the west. Although the land is part of Clarkson and Mindarie at present, Satterley, the developers, intend for the estate to eventually be re-gazetted as its own suburb.

Demographics
Clarkson had a population of 7,082 at the 2006 census, an increase of 1,214 persons since the 2001 census. The population of Clarkson is predicted to continue to grow at an exponential rate, peaking at 18,645 in 2026. Only 58.9% of Clarkson's population were born in Australia compared to a nationwide average of 70.9%. A significant British-born population is present, being 15.4%, although this is a smaller proportion compared to some nearby suburbs, such as Mindarie. Most other major immigrant groups in Clarkson hail from Anglophone countries, such as New Zealand and South Africa.

Clarkson has a very young population, with an average age of 28, a figure drastically lower than all surrounding suburbs, as well as the national average age of 37. Income levels in Clarkson are generally in line with the Australian national average, with an average household income of $1,049 per week, compared to $1,027 per week nationally.

Christianity is the predominant religious affiliation declared by Clarkson's residents, at 44% of the population, across various denominations. Several churches are scattered throughout the suburb; Clarkson Seventh-day Adventist Community Church, St. Andrew's Catholic Church and Ocean Keys Community Church (Lutheran). 28% of the suburb declared no religion.

2.8% of Clarkson's population is composed of Indigenous Australians, compared to 2.3% nationwide. Only neighbouring Merriwa reflects this trend; the Aboriginal population is much less significant in the surrounding suburbs.

Amenities and facilities

Compared to surrounding suburbs, Clarkson is a very mixed-use area with an abundance of facilities and a very large shopping and retail district, establishing it as a commercial town centre for the northern suburbs beyond the nearby city of Joondalup. The main road, Ocean Keys Boulevard, is home to the Ocean Keys Shopping Centre, a major shopping mall with a large number of major retail outlets, including Aldi, Target, Coles, Woolworths, JB Hi-Fi, City Beach and 115 specialty retailers.

Many more commercial outlets surround the centre, including a large Bunnings Warehouse, a post office, two service stations and Toyota, Ford, Holden and Nissan car dealerships. Just east of Bunnings Warehouse is a McDonald's.

A strip of restaurants and take-away outlets are situated directly west of the Shopping Centre, including branches of KFC, Hungry Jack's, Wokinabox, Subway, Pizza Hut, Sushi Noodle World, Masala Indian Restaurant and The Cheesecake Factory. There are also other restaurants located within the suburb, such as Nando's, Cold Rock Ice Creamery and a kebab shop that are both located on the external perimeter of the shopping centre (north-east corner), new Indian restaurants opening near the train station, and a fish and chip shop located at the Clarkson Mini-Mart. The Whale+Ale pub and restaurant is located on the north side of Ocean Keys Boulevard, opposite the shopping centre. It is the only pub and main hub for nightlife in the suburb. There are 3 medical centres in the suburb, which are the Clarkson Family Practice, Ocean Keys Family Practice and The Somerly Central Medical Centre. Opposite Ocean Keys Shopping Centre is Clarkson Library.

Clarkson also has a smaller shopping market built in the first area of Clarkson developed. It is located opposite the Clarkson Primary School on the corner of Renshaw Boulevard and Ainsbury Parade. It features the mini-mart store, dentist, bottle shop, fish supply (plus fish and chips) and other small businesses.

There is an abundance of entertainment and leisure facilities around Clarkson. Over ten parks are located throughout the suburb, the two main ones being Anthony Waring Park and Richard Aldersea Park in the centre of the suburb. Anthony Waring Park is the largest by area and features sporting facilities. Many smaller parks around Somerly include playgrounds and free barbecue areas for families. The Clarkson Youth Centre, near Ocean Keys Shopping Centre, functions as a community centre and is also part of a wider youth precinct, incorporating a skate park and BMX tracks. Nearby is also the Clarkson Library, one of four public libraries in the Wanneroo area.

Clarkson also accommodates the Clarkson Police Station, which serves all surrounding suburbs from Tamala Park to Butler and Jindalee. A Western Power electricity substation is located off Hester Avenue in the north-east of the suburb, near the Joondalup railway line. Telephone services are provided by the Mindarie & Quinns Rocks telephone exchanges.

Education
Two state K-7 primary schools are established in Clarkson, serving different parts of the suburb. Clarkson Primary School is the oldest established school and caters to western Clarkson, while Somerly Primary School serves the Somerly estate in the east. Students also have the option of St. Andrew's Catholic Primary School, a private Catholic school located next to St. Andrew's Catholic Church.

Clarkson also accommodates Clarkson Community High School, a large Year 8-12 state high school established in 1996. As it is the only state high school in the vicinity (other than the 11-12 Mindarie Senior College), it covers a large catchment area, extending up to Butler and Jindalee in the north. In 2010, Trades North, a TAFE campus specializing in skilled trades and apprenticeships, was built next to the high school and opened for the 2011 school year. It is part of the North Metropolitan TAFE.

Transport

Clarkson straddles the western edge of the Mitchell Freeway, linking it to Joondalup and the Perth CBD, with interchanges at Neerabup Road in the south and Hester Avenue in the north. Marmion Avenue and Connolly Drive are major north-south arterial roads that pass through Clarkson on the way to Yanchep and Alkimos, while Neerabup Road and Hester Avenue both run east-west to Wanneroo Road a short distance inland.

Up until the late-2000s, Marmion Avenue and Hester Avenue were the only roads in and out of Clarkson. Connolly Drive was extended to Clarkson from Kinross in 2008, while Neerabup Road was extended from Connolly Drive into southeast Clarkson and across to Wanneroo Road in 2016.

The Clarkson railway station on the Joondalup line was built in 2004 in the suburb's southeast, and was the terminus of the line until 2014, when Butler railway station opened to the north. It provides bus and rail links to Joondalup and Butler, and a direct rail link to Perth and Mandurah. The station sits in the middle of the Mitchell Freeway median strip and is accessed by bridge.

Swan Transit operate the following bus routes from Clarkson station, to all surrounding suburbs.

 474 - Clarkson to Joondalup via Kinross and Currambine
 480 - Clarkson to Butler railway station via Marmion Avenue
 481 - Clarkson to Quinns Rocks (south) via Mindarie
 482 - Clarkson to Butler via Quinns Rocks (north)
 483 - Clarkson to Alkimos via Butler (west) and Merriwa
 484 - Clarkson to Alkimos via Butler (east) via Ridgewood

Politics
There is one polling booth in Clarkson, at Clarkson Community High School. Along with its neighbouring suburbs, Clarkson is part of the Mindarie electoral district. At the federal level it was formerly part of the Pearce federal division, but was transferred to Moore, along with Mindarie and Neerabup, as of 2010.

Clarkson has traditionally been an Australian Labor Party stronghold since the early 2000s (decade) in State elections, in line with many northern Perth suburbs. At federal level, the voting is much less clear-cut, with both major parties gaining consecutive election victories in the suburb since 2001.

References

Suburbs of Perth, Western Australia
Suburbs of the City of Wanneroo